Rautbesi is a village development committee in Nuwakot District in the Bagmati Zone of central Nepal. At the time of the 1991 Nepal census it had a population of 3049 people living in 597 individual households.

Notable people 

 Arjun Narsingh KC
 Kedar Narsingh KC

References

External links
UN map of the municipalities of Nuwakot District

Populated places in Nuwakot District